Richard Rennie Turner (24 April 1882 in Hornsey – 1 December 1960 in Worthing) was a British footballer who won a gold medal at the 1900 Summer Olympics as part of the Upton Park club side. Turner was an outside-right with Crouch End Vampires who joined Upton Park solely for the period of the Olympics. He scored one goal against the USFSA team.

References

Sources
Ian Buchanan, British Olympians, Guinness, London, 1991.

External links

 List of players for Upton Park (1866–1887 and 1891–1911)

English footballers
Olympic gold medallists for Great Britain
Olympic footballers of Great Britain
Footballers at the 1900 Summer Olympics
Upton Park F.C. players
Olympic medalists in football
1882 births
1960 deaths
Association football forwards
Medalists at the 1900 Summer Olympics
FA Cup Final players
Footballers from Hornsey